SCG may refer to:

 Saban Capital Group, a private investment firm founded in 2001 by Haim Saban based in Los Angeles, California focused on media, entertainment, and communications investments
 SCG, the ISO 3166-1 alpha-3 code for the former union of Serbia and Montenegro, which peacefully split in 2006 into two countries
 SCG International Risk, a private military contractor and security firm
 Screen Cartoonist's Guild
 Scuderia Cameron Glickenhaus, an American high-performance car manufacturer
 Self-Changing Gears, a British company
 Seychelles Coast Guard
 Shanghai Construction Group, a Chinese construction and engineering firm
 Siam Cement Group, the largest cement manufacturer in Thailand and patron of SCG Muangthong United
 Socialist Campaign Group, a left-wing grouping of UK Labour Party MPs
 Southern Connecticut Gas Company
 Stone Crossing railway station, Kent, England (National Rail station code)
 Stuart MacGill, former Australian cricketer
 SCG, the subcubic graph function, a variation of Friedman's SSCG function, in mathematics
 Summa contra Gentiles, a Christian studies book
 Superior cervical ganglion, the largest of the cervical ganglia
 Sydney Cricket Ground, a sports stadium in Sydney, Australia
 Sun City Girls, a now defunct United States experimental band.

sv:Lista över nationalitetsmärken för motorfordon#S